Grouville Church is one of the twelve ancient parish churches in the island of Jersey; it is sited in the eastern parish of Grouville.

Name 

Grouville Church is dedicated to Saint Martin of Tours under the name "St Martin de Grouville", thus distinguishing it from St Martin's Church, where the dedication is to "St Martin le Vieux"; this indicates that Grouville was founded some time after the foundation of St Martin's.

Bibliography 

Balleine's Biographical Dictionary of Jersey
Balleine's History of Jersey
The Cartulaire of Jersey
The Bulletin of the Société Jersiaise
Jersey Churches by Paul Harrison
Channel Island Churches, McCormack
"A Brief History of Grouville Church", A. M. Bellows. URL last accessed 2007-02-15.

External links
Grouville Parish Church Web site

History of Jersey
Churches in Jersey
Buildings and structures in Grouville